Kazemabad (also Romanized as Kāz̧emābād) is a village in Chahdegal Rural District, Negin Kavir District, Fahraj County, Kerman Province, Iran. At the 2006 census, its population was 54, in 13 families.

References 

Populated places in Fahraj County